Barbora Krejčíková and Kateřina Siniaková defeated the defending champion Elise Mertens and her partner Zhang Shuai in the final, 6–2, 6–4 to win the ladies' doubles tennis title at the 2022 Wimbledon Championships. It was their second Wimbledon title together and fifth major title together overall.

Hsieh Su-wei and Mertens were the reigning champions, but Hsieh did not return to compete.

Samantha Stosur was attempting to complete the career Grand Slam but she lost in the first round to Aliona Bolsova and Ingrid Neel.

This was the first edition of Wimbledon to feature a champions tie-break (10-point tie-break), when the score reaches six games all in the third set, and the third edition to feature a final set tie-break. Jule Niemeier, Andrea Petkovic, Miyu Kato and Aldila Sutjiadi were the first players to contest this tiebreak in the ladies' doubles event, with the team of Niemeier and Petkovic winning the tiebreak 14–12 in their first-round match.

Seeds

Draw

Finals

Top half

Section 1

Section 2

Bottom half

Section 3

Section 4

Other entry information

Wild cards

Protected ranking

Alternates

Withdrawals
Before the tournament
  Misaki Doi /  Makoto Ninomiya → replaced by  Han Xinyun /  Zhu Lin
  Danka Kovinić /  Rebecca Peterson → replaced by  Anna-Lena Friedsam /  Ann Li
  Elena Rybakina /  Clara Tauson → replaced by  Valentini Grammatikopoulou /  Peangtarn Plipuech
  Rosalie van der Hoek /  Alison Van Uytvanck → replaced by  Elisabetta Cocciaretto /  Viktoriya Tomova

Explanatory Notes

References

External links
 Ladies' Doubles draw

Women's Doubles
Wimbledon Championship by year – Women's doubles